Now Is the Hour is an album by the American jazz bassist Charlie Haden's Quartet West, released in 1996 on the Verve label.

Reception 
The AllMusic review by Tim Sheridan stated: "Seldom does modern music so perfectly evoke a time and place in history as this terrific band. Fans of Haden's Liberation Music Orchestra will find the simple accessibility either surprising or disappointing, but fans of classic, romantic jazz will find joy".

Track listing 
All compositions by Charlie Haden except as indicated
 "Here's Looking at You" - 6:11 
 "The Left Hand of God" (Victor Young) - 7:48 
 "Requiem" (Lennie Tristano) - 1:31 
 "Back Home Blues" (Charlie Parker) - 4:04 
 "There in a Dream" - 7:04 
 "All Through the Night" (Cole Porter) - 4:12 
 "Detour Ahead" (Lou Carter, Herb Ellis, John Freigo) - 6:04 
 "Blue Pearl" (Bud Powell) - 4:32 
 "When Tomorrow Comes" (Alan Broadbent) - 4:37 
 "Palo Alto" (Lee Konitz) - 4:54 
 "Marables's Parable" - 3:30 
 "Now Is the Hour (Haere Ra)" (Maewa Kaihau, Clement Scott, Dorothy Stewart) - 4:58 
Recorded at Studios Guillaume Tell in Suresnes-Paris, France on July 18–20, 1995

Personnel 
 Charlie Haden – bass
 Ernie Watts - tenor saxophone
 Alan Broadbent - piano
 Larance Marable - drums
 String Orchestra arranged and conducted by Alan Broadbent (tracks 1–3, 5, 7, 9 & 12)

References 

Verve Records albums
Charlie Haden albums
1996 albums
Albums produced by Charlie Haden